The 2003 Checker Auto Parts 500 presented by Havoline was the 34th stock car race of the 2003 NASCAR Winston Cup Series season and the 16th iteration of the event. The race was held on Sunday, November 2, 2003, before an audience of 100,000 in Avondale, Arizona at Phoenix International Raceway, a 1-mile (1.6 km) permanent low-banked tri-oval race track. The race took the scheduled 312 laps to complete. Within the final laps of the race, Dale Earnhardt, Inc. driver Dale Earnhardt Jr. would manage to defend the field on the final restart with nine to go to take his ninth career NASCAR Winston Cup Series victory and his second and final victory of the season. To fill out the top three, Hendrick Motorsports driver Jimmie Johnson and Penske Racing South driver Ryan Newman would finish second and third, respectively.

Background 

Phoenix International Raceway – also known as PIR – is a one-mile, low-banked tri-oval race track located in Avondale, Arizona. It is named after the nearby metropolitan area of Phoenix. The motorsport track opened in 1964 and currently hosts two NASCAR race weekends annually. PIR has also hosted the IndyCar Series, CART, USAC and the Rolex Sports Car Series. The raceway is currently owned and operated by International Speedway Corporation.

The raceway was originally constructed with a 2.5 mi (4.0 km) road course that ran both inside and outside of the main tri-oval. In 1991 the track was reconfigured with the current 1.51 mi (2.43 km) interior layout. PIR has an estimated grandstand seating capacity of around 67,000. Lights were installed around the track in 2004 following the addition of a second annual NASCAR race weekend.

Entry list 

 (R) denotes rookie driver.

Practice

First practice 
The first practice session was held on Friday, October 31, at 12:20 PM EST. The session would last for two hours.

Second practice 
The second practice session was held on Saturday, November 1, at 11:30 AM EST. The session would last for 45 minutes.

Final practice 
The final practice session, sometimes referred to as Happy Hour, was held on Saturday, November 1, at 1:10 PM EST. The session would last for 45 minutes.

Qualifying 
Qualifying was held on Friday, October 31, at 4:05 PM EST. Each driver would have two laps to set a fastest time; the fastest of the two would count as their official qualifying lap. Positions 1-36 would be decided on time, while positions 37-43 would be based on provisionals. Six spots are awarded by the use of provisionals based on owner's points. The seventh is awarded to a past champion who has not otherwise qualified for the race. If no past champ needs the provisional, the next team in the owner points will be awarded a provisional.

Two drivers would fail to qualify: Derrike Cope and Brandon Ash.

Full qualifying results

Race results

References 

2003 NASCAR Winston Cup Series
NASCAR races at Phoenix Raceway
November 2003 sports events in the United States
2003 in sports in Arizona